Reza Niknazar (born 23 August 1980 in Rasht) is an Iranian football player who is currently a free agent. He usually plays at defender position. He played his golden years for Malavan in Iran Pro League.

References
Iran Premier League Stats

1980 births
Living people
Iranian footballers
Sepidrood Rasht players
Saba players
Persepolis F.C. players
Malavan players
Damash Gilan players
Nassaji Mazandaran players
Persian Gulf Pro League players
People from Rasht
Association football defenders
Sportspeople from Gilan province